Xeniinae is a subfamily of grasshoppers in the family Proscopiidae. Xeniinae has 3 genera, 2 extant and 1 extinct, and about 16 described species, found in South America.

Genera
These three genera belong to the subfamily Xeniinae:
 Altograciosa - monotypic A. mirabilis Liana, 1980
 Astroma Charpentier, 1845
 Xenium - monotypic X.  saburrae Liana, 1980

References

Further reading

 
 

Caelifera
Proscopiidae
Orthoptera subfamilies